Priscila Faria de Oliveira (born 10 March 1982) is a Brazilian women's international footballer who plays as a midfielder. She is a member of the Brazil women's national football team. She was part of the team at the 1999 FIFA Women's World Cup and 2003 FIFA Women's World Cup.

References

1982 births
Living people
Brazilian women's footballers
Brazil women's international footballers
Place of birth missing (living people)
1999 FIFA Women's World Cup players
2003 FIFA Women's World Cup players
Women's association football midfielders